Stade de Baham is a multi-use stadium in Baham, Cameroon.  It is currently used mostly for football matches. It served as the former  home ground of Fovu Baham. The stadium holds 7,000 people.

References

Football venues in Cameroon